Infrastructure NSW is an agency of the Government of New South Wales that provides independent advice to assist the NSW Government in identifying and prioritising the delivery of critical public infrastructure across the Australian state of New South Wales for economic and social wellbeing.

It was established in 2011 by the O'Farrell government and reports to the Premier of New South Wales.

History 
The independent agency, established under the Infrastructure NSW Act 2011, was set up in July 2011 to plan and oversee a wide-ranging upgrade of the state's infrastructure. One of Infrastructure NSW's first major tasks was to deliver a 20-year State Infrastructure Strategy, which was delivered in September 2012. Other initial priorities for the body were the redevelopment of  Sydney Convention & Exhibition Centre, planning of WestConnex and traffic management around Sydney Airport and Port Botany.

In May 2011, Barry O'Farrell appointed former Liberal Premier Nick Greiner as chairman and in June, economist and ex Sydney Water boss Paul Broad was appointed as the chief executive officer, on a reported salary of up to 500,000.

On 23 May 2013, both Greiner and Broad quit their respective roles at Infrastructure NSW over repeated disputes with the O'Farrell government. The former head of the Business Council of Australia Graham Bradley was appointed as the new chairman and former Secretary of the Victorian Department of Transport Jim Betts became interim CEO, and was later appointed permanently.

On 25 November 2014, Infrastructure NSW published the State Infrastructure Strategy Update 2014, which made 30 investment recommendations on the next round of critical infrastructure for NSW. The NSW Government fully adopted the recommendations proposed by Infrastructure NSW for its State Infrastructure Strategy, which includes a $20 billion infrastructure program.

On 5 November 2015, Minister for Transport and Infrastructure Andrew Constance announced Projects NSW – a specialist
unit within Infrastructure NSW to manage the procurement and delivery of the state’s infrastructure priorities.

Board members 
The Board of Infrastructure NSW contains a total of ten members, including the chief executive officer, Chairman, five private sector members and three senior NSW public servants:
Graham Bradley, Chairman
Simon Draper, Chief Executive Officer
Roger Fletcher
Dieter Adamsas
Arlene Tansey
Max Moore-Wilton
Rod Pearse
Blair Comley, Secretary, Department of Premier and Cabinet
Carolyn McNally, Secretary, Department of Planning and Environment
Rob Whitfield, Secretary, New South Wales Treasury

Past Board members include Griener, Broad, David Gonski, Chris Eccles, Sam Haddad, Mark Paterson, and Carolyn Kay.

References

External links

Government agencies of New South Wales
Government agencies established in 2011
2011 establishments in Australia